Terry Ricardo Thomas (born 1 May 1997) is a Jamaican track and field athlete who specializes in middle-distance running. Representing Jamaica at the 2019 World Athletics Championships, he won a silver medal in men's 4 × 400 metres relay with the Jamaican team.

References

External links
 

Jamaican male middle-distance runners
1997 births
Living people
World Athletics Championships athletes for Jamaica
World Athletics Championships medalists